This is a list of international trips made by Josip Broz Tito, during his reign as the prime minister and later President of Yugoslavia. Josip Broz Tito visited 72 different countries during his time in office, between 1944 and his death in 1980. Tito's oversea trips were often named "Peace travels" by Yugoslavian media.

Countries that Tito visited at least ten times were: Soviet Union (18 visits), Romania (17) and Egypt (14).

1940s

1950s

1960s

1970s

References 

Josip Broz Tito
20th century in international relations
Broz Tito
Broz Tito